Fraternidad is a municipality in the Honduran department of Ocotepeque.

Demographics
At the time of the 2013 Honduras census, Fraternidad municipality had a population of 4,890. Of these, 99.59% were Mestizo, 0.25% Indigenous, 0.08% White and 0.08% Black or Afro-Honduran.

References

Municipalities of the Ocotepeque Department